was the fifteenth of the fifty-three stations of the Tōkaidō. It is located in what is now part of the Shimizu-ku ward of Shizuoka, Shizuoka Prefecture, Japan. It is one of four former post stations located in Shimizu-ku.

History
The original Kanbara-juku was decimated by a flood in the early part of the Edo period, but was rebuilt shortly thereafter. 

The classic ukiyo-e print by Andō Hiroshige (Hōeidō edition) from 1831–1834, depicts a mountain village at nightfall, through which three people are struggling under deep snow. It is a rather strange composition, as Kanbara is located in a very temperate area warmed by the Kuroshio current offshore, and even a light snowfall is extremely rare.

In Japan (as everywhere), many villages in different parts of the country have the same name.  Hiroshige intended his print to represent the Kanbara which was the 15th post station on the Tokaido Road, which ran from Edo and Kyoto. But in creating his portfolio The 53 stations of the Tokaido Road, apparently he often relied on existing prints and guidebooks.  It seems likely that he mistakenly used an image of a very different Kanbara: the one depicted here is probably a village in the very mountainous Gunma prefecture near the resort town of Karuizawa.  It is famous as the village buried during the August 1783 eruption of Mt. Asama, which killed 466 people.

Neighboring post towns
Tōkaidō
Yoshiwara-juku - Kanbara-juku - Yui-shuku

Further reading
Carey, Patrick. Rediscovering the Old Tokaido:In the Footsteps of Hiroshige. Global Books UK (2000). 
Chiba, Reiko. Hiroshige's Tokaido in Prints and Poetry. Tuttle. (1982) 
Taganau, Jilly. The Tokaido Road: Travelling and Representation in Edo and Meiji Japan. RoutledgeCurzon (2004).

References

Stations of the Tōkaidō
Stations of the Tōkaidō in Shizuoka Prefecture